The Manung Kangjeibung is an old polo field located to the south west of the citadel inside the Kangla Fort in Imphal West district of Manipur. In ancient times, only royalties and nobilities were allowed to play the game of polo in this royal playground.
It is one of the two most ancient pologrounds in the world, the another one being the Mapal Kangjeibung (Imphal Polo Ground).

Etymology 

In Meitei language (officially called Manipuri language), "manung" means "inside" or "inner side".

The Meitei term "kāngjeibung" means pologround (polo field). Morphologically, the word "kāng‑jei‑bung" can be divided into three roots, "kāng", "jei" and "bung", meaning "a round/spherical object", "stick" and "mound" respectively.
The Meitei term for stick is originally "cei".

History 
In accordance to the ancient manuscripts known as the PuYas, the "Manung Kangjeibung" is one of the oldest pologrounds. It is said that King Ningthou Kangba used to play the game of polo in the Manung Kangjeibung. Later, the polo field was developed during the reign of King Marjit Singh (1813-1819).

Serving as a helipad 
On 9 May 2018, Nongthombam Biren Singh, the Chief Minister of Manipur, as a chairperson in the 27th meeting of the Kangla Fort Board,  had a discussion regarding the shifting of the helipad service from the "Manung Kangjeibung" pologround of the Kangla Fort complex. 
The discussion meeting was participated by Th. Satyabrata Singh, MLA, J. Suresh Babu, Chief Secretary, L.M. Khaute, DHP, M. Lakshmikumar, Commissioner (Art and Culture), Ng. Uttam, Director (Art and Culture), Superintendent of Archaeology Department and many others.

Polo matches 
According to the "All Manipur Polo Association (AMPA)", the Chief Minister's upcoming Sagol Kangjei Championship 2022 is going to be organized at the Manung Kangjeibung inside the Kangla. It is to be a part of the annual Sangai festival events.

See also 
 Meitei horse (Manipuri pony)
 Hapta Kangjeibung
 Iputhou Pakhangba Laisang
 Hijagang
 Kangla Sanathong
 Statue of Meidingu Nara Singh

Notes

References

External links 

 
 
 

Cultural heritage of India
Entertainment venues in India
Landmarks in India
Meitei culture
Monuments and memorials in India
Monuments and memorials in Imphal
Monuments and memorials in Manipur
Monuments and memorials to Meitei people
Monuments and memorials to Meitei royalties
Tourist attractions in India
Tourist attractions in Manipur